Labeobarbus claudinae is a species of ray-finned fish in the  family Cyprinidae.
It is found in Burundi and Rwanda.
Its natural habitats are rivers, freshwater lakes, freshwater marshes, and inland deltas.
It is threatened by habitat loss.

References

claudinae
Fish described in 1990
Taxonomy articles created by Polbot